Viliami Penisini (born, 31 July 2002) is a Tonga international rugby league footballer who plays as a  for the Parramatta Eels in the NRL.

Background
Penisini was born in Blacktown, New South Wales, Australia. He is of Tongan heritage. 

He played his junior football for the Rouse Hill Rhinos. 

Penisini attended Quakers Hill East Public School from Kindergarten to Year 6, winning many sporting accolades and becoming a popular figure among his peers and teachers for his sporting prowess, particularly in rugby league and union. He first attended Patrician Brothers' College, Blacktown and then transferred at the end of year 7 to The King's School, Parramatta. While at King's, he was a member of the premiership winning First XV rugby union team in 2018 and captain of the undefeated First XV rugby union team in 2020.

In 2016, at the age of 14, Penisini joined Parramatta Eels' junior development squad.

Playing career

2019 & 2020
Penisini played for Parramatta's SG Ball and Jersey Flegg teams in 2019 & 2020. Representing the NSW under 16's & 18's teams in 2018 and 2019, breaking his ankle in the under 18's game. Due to COVID-19, Penisini played for Kings XV rugby union team.

2021
Penisini started 2021 training with Parramatta's first grade team, on March 4, 2021, Penisini was upgraded to the club's 30 man squad signing with Parramatta until the end of 2022. Penisini later re-signed with Parramatta for a further season until 2023.  In round 19 2021, Penisini made his NRL debut for Parramatta against the Canberra Raiders in a 12–10 loss at Cbus Super Stadium on the Gold Coast. In round 23, he scored his first try in the NRL during a 32–16 victory over North Queensland side.

Penisini played in both of Parramatta's finals matches in the 2021 NRL season against Newcastle and Penrith.

2022
In round 11 of the 2022 NRL season, Penisini scored the winning try for Parramatta in their 22–20 victory over Manly.

In round 19 of the 2022 NRL season, Penisini was sent to the sin bin for a professional foul during Parramatta's 36–14 loss against Brisbane.

Penisini played for Parramatta in their 2022 NRL Grand Final loss against Penrith.

In the third group game at the 2021 Rugby League World Cup, Penisini scored four tries in Tonga's 92-10 victory over the Cook Islands at the Riverside Stadium.

2023
On 31 January, Penisini signed a two-year contract extension to remain at Parramatta until the end of the 2025 season.

References

External links
Parramatta Eels profile
Penisini upgraded to top 30
Parramatta Profile
Penisini Kings XV highlights
Penisini better than Suaalii
Under 16's team list
Under 18's team list

2002 births
Living people
Australian rugby league players
Australian sportspeople of Tongan descent
Parramatta Eels players
Rugby league centres
Rugby league players from Blacktown
Tonga national rugby league team players